Club Eagles, formerly known as Eagles Malé, is a sports club based in Malé, Maldives. It is best known for its football team. The team were promoted to Dhivehi League in 2006 and relegated back to the Second Division the next season. They were again promoted to the top division in 2011, after several years.

History
Club Eagles was founded on 22 June 1989 and was promoted to the top flight Dhivehi League in 2006.

After preliminary round win against Thimphu City on AFC Cup debut in April 2021, on 15 August they faced Indian side Bengaluru FC in the qualifying play-offs, but lost the game 1–0.

Continental record

Players

Current squad

References

External links
Club Eagles official at Facebook

Football clubs in the Maldives
Association football clubs established in 1989
1989 establishments in the Maldives
Dhivehi Premier League clubs